Rahimatpur is a city and a municipal council in Satara district in the Indian state of Maharashtra.

Rahimatpur has an average elevation of 657 metres (2155 feet).

Demographics
 India census, Rahimatpur had a population of 25,539. Males constitute 51% of the population and females 49%. Rahimatpur has an average literacy rate of 82%, higher than the national average of 59.5%: male literacy is 78%, and female literacy is 67%. In Rahimatpur, 12% of the population is under 1 years of age.

Administration 

Rahimatpur municipal council was established in 1853. It is the 2nd oldest municipal council in India.

Culture 

Rahimatpur is the place of birth of the famous Marathi playwright Vasant Kanetkar who wrote the Marathi play "Raigadaala Jevha Jaag Yete". Marathi poet Kavi Girish was his father. Actress Jyoti Subhash also belongs to this place. Rahimatpur's biggest fair is celebrated on Sharad Purnima every year.

Education 
"Sardar Babasaheb Mane Mahavidyalaya Rahimatpur" "Jr. College Of Education D.Ed college Rahimatpur"
"Jr.College of Science, Arts, Commerce Rahimatpur." 
"Adarsh Vidyalaya, Rahimatpur" 
"Computer World Rahimatpur.(SUNIL KORE)"  "VG Paranjape Vidyalaya Rahimatpur"  "Rosary School Rahimatpur" "Kanya Prashala Rahimatpur" "Vasantdada patil Vidyalaya Rahimatpur" and four govt. Primary schools(like zilha parishad schools).
"Padm.."

References

Cities and towns in Satara district